Sara Moulton (born February 19, 1952) is an American  cookbook author and television personality.  In an article for The New York Times, Kim Severson described Moulton as "one of the nation’s most enduring recipe writers and cooking teachers...and a dean of food television and magazines".

Moulton was the on-air food editor for Good Morning America, a morning news-and-talk show broadcast on the ABC television network, from 1997 through 2012. She was the chef of the executive dining room at Gourmet for 20 years, a stint that ended when the magazine ceased publication in 2009.

Between 1996 and 2005, Moulton hosted Cooking Live (1997–2002), Cooking Live Primetime (1999), and Sara's Secrets (2002–2005) on the Food Network, becoming one of the original stars of that cable-and-satellite-television channel during its first decade. Her career in television and cooking has spanned nearly 40 years.

Moulton is the author of several cookbooks and videos, notably Sara Moulton Cooks at Home (2002), Sara's Secrets for Weeknight Meals (2005), and Sara Moulton's Everyday Family Dinners (2010).

In 1982, Moulton co-founded the New York Women's Culinary Alliance.

Since 2008, Moulton has been the host of Sara's Weeknight Meals, a cooking show distributed by American Public Television.  From August 2012 through October 2018, Moulton was the author of a weekly cooking column for the Associated Press.

In October 2016, Moulton joined Christopher Kimball's "Milk Street Radio", a weekly show broadcast by National Public Radio, as a cohost.

Early life and education
Moulton was born in New York City, and attended The Brearley School in New York City.

The idea of channeling her childhood passion for food into a career did not occur to Moulton until after she graduated from the University of Michigan in Ann Arbor, Michigan with a major in the history of ideas.

Moulton enrolled at the Culinary Institute of America in Hyde Park, New York, in 1975 and graduated with highest honors in 1977, winning a scholarship from Les Dames d'Escoffier in the process.

Career
She began working in restaurants immediately, first in Boston, Massachusetts, and then in New York City, taking off time only for a postgraduate apprenticeship with Master Chef Maurice Cazalis of the Henri IV Restaurant in Chartres, France, in 1979. Between 1981 and 1983 she was the chef tournant at La Tulipe, a three-star restaurant in New York City.

In the interest of starting a family, she left restaurant work and began devoting herself instead to recipe testing and development. Moulton worked for two years as an instructor at Peter Kump's New York Cooking School (now known as the Institute of Culinary Education), where she discovered her love of teaching.

In 1984, she took a job in the test kitchen at Gourmet. Four years later she became chef of the magazine's executive dining room.

Television
In 1979, Moulton's television career began when she was hired to work behind the scenes on Julia Child & More Company, a cooking program on PBS. Her friendship with Julia Child led eventually to Moulton's job at Good Morning America, where what started as another behind-the-scenes position ripened in 1997 into on-camera work.

By then, she had begun hosting the Food Network's Cooking Live. Six years and over 1,200 hour-long shows later, that show ended on March 31, 2002. Sara's Secrets, which began the next day, ran until 2007.  “Sara Moulton is a chef, and one of the few people knowledgeable enough to field live phone-in queries, the basis of her show," wrote The New Yorker's Bill Buford. "Cooking Live" was nominated as the James Beard Awards' Best National Television Cooking Show in 1999 and 2000.

The eleventh season of "Sara's Weeknight Meals" began airing on American Public Television in October 2022.  The show was nominated for a James Beard Award in 2013 and 2015, while Moulton herself has been nominated three times as Outstanding Personality/Host, most recently in 2014.

Cookbooks and cooking columns 
Her first cookbook, Sara Moulton Cooks at Home, was published by Broadway Books in October 2002, and was meant to counter America's disastrous love affair with fast food by encouraging everyone to cook delicious and healthy food at home and to dine with family and friends. "While rooted in classic French technique, the book also accommodates the American hunger for convenience, novelty and freshness," wrote Mike Dunne for The Sacramento Bee.

Moulton's second cookbook, Sara's Secrets for Weeknight Meals, was published by Broadway Books in October 2005. It was reviewed by Michelle Green in People magazine, who wrote:  "Sara has a gift for creating quick, accessible fine cuisine. Why suffer to make a gorgeous meal?"

Her third cookbook, Sara Moulton's Everyday Family Dinners, was published by Simon & Schuster in April 2010.  Blogging for StoveTop Readings in November 2010, Greg Mowery wrote:  "If there is a less pretentious, more accessible, and creative cookbook that gets great food on the table in good time with the least amount of fuss, I haven't seen it this year….This new book belongs in every family kitchen."

Moulton's fourth cookbook, Home Cooking 101:  How to Make Everything Taste Better, was published Oxmoor House in March 2016.<ref>Home Cooking 101:  How to Make Everything Taste Better,' https://www.amazon.com/Sara-Moultons-Home-Cooking-101/dp/0848744411/ref=sr_1_1?s=books&ie=UTF8&qid=1457449760&sr=1-1&keywords=home+cooking+101</ref>  Diana K. Rice, in The Huffington Post, described it as "extremely useful to the home cook.   [Looks] like a textbook, albeit...with fabulous food photos and enticing recipes."

In August 2012 Moulton began writing a weekly column entitled "The Healthy Plate" for the Associated Press.  In January 2015, she replaced it with a new column called "KitchenWise," which ran through October 2018.  Between November 2016 and September 2018, Moulton contributed a monthly column called "Sunday Supper" to The Washington Post Magazine. From January 2018 through June 2021, Moulton contributed a quarterly column entitled "Maize Graze" to the University of Michigan's Alumnus Magazine.

 Awards 
 2001 Culinary Institute of America's Chef of the Year.
 2002 inducted into the James Beard Foundation's Who's Who of Food and Beverage in America.
 2011  Sara Moulton's Everyday Family Dinners was an International Association of Culinary Professionals Cookbook Awards Winner in the category of Children, Youth and Family.
The International Restaurant & Foodservice Show of New York & Ferdinand Metz Foodservice Forum 2016 Beacon Award.
 2018 Culinary Institute of America Leadership Award.

Personal life
Moulton's husband is Bill Adler, an American music journalist and critic. They have two children. Moulton and her family live in New York City, New York.

Bibliography
Moulton, Sara; Anderson, Jean (2000).  The Good Morning America Cut the Calories Cookbook120 Delicious Low-Fat, Low-Calorie Recipes from Our Viewers. Hyperion Books (New York City). .
Moulton, Sara; Pierce, Charles (2002).  Sara Moulton Cooks at Home. Broadway Books (New York City). .
Moulton, Sara; Hayes, Joanne Lamb (2005).  Sara's Secrets for Weeknight Meals. Broadway Books (New York City). .
Moulton, Sara (2010).  Sara Moulton's Everyday Family Dinners. Simon & Schuster (New York City). .
Moulton, Sara (2016).  Home Cooking 101:  How to Make Everything Taste Better. Oxmoor House.  .

Videography
Moulton, Sara; Food and Beverage Institute (Culinary Institute of America); Culinary Institute of America (1999?). Great Chefs Series with Sara Moulton. Food and Beverage Institute (Hyde Park, New York).  (VHS format).
Moulton, Sara; Hallquist, Gary; Prime Time Video Productions; Johnson & Wales University (2000).  Chef Sara Moulton. Prime Time Video Productions (Providence, Rhode Island).   (VHS format).
Moulton, Sara; Flay, Bobby; Deen, Paula H.; Ray, Rachael; Food Network. (2003).  Cooking from the Grill. Food Network (New York City).   (DVD format).
Moulton, Sara; Food Network (2004).  Sara's Secrets with Sara MoultonCelebrating the Holidays. Food Network (New York City).   (DVD format).
Moulton, Sara; Food Network (2004).  Sara's Secrets with Sara MoultonEffortless Entertaining  Food Network (New York City).   (DVD format).
Moulton, Sara; Food Network (2006).  Sara's Secrets with Sara MoultonCelebrating the Holidays. Food Network (New York City).   (DVD format). (reissue, with additional material, of 2004 release)
Garten, Ina; Moulton, Sara; Deen, Paula H.; Food Network (2006).  Holiday Best, 2006''. Food Network (New York City).   (DVD format).

See also

List of American writers
List of chefs
List of Michigan writers
List of non-fiction writers
List of people from New York City
List of television presenters
List of University of Michigan alumni

Notes

References

External links
 saramoulton.com, Moulton's official website
 Sara Moulton at the Chef and Restaurant Database
 

1952 births
20th-century American women writers
21st-century American women writers
ABC News personalities
American food writers
American television chefs
American television hosts
Culinary Institute of America Hyde Park alumni
Food Network chefs
Living people
PBS people
University of Michigan alumni
Writers from Michigan
Writers from New York City
Writers from Boston
Women food writers
Women cookbook writers
American women chefs
Brearley School alumni
American women non-fiction writers
21st-century American non-fiction writers
American women television presenters
International Association of Culinary Professionals award winners